(A Ballad of) A Peaceful Man is Gravy Train's second — and probably their most praised — album, released in late 1971. Unlike their heavier debut, this album sports some lovely string arrangements, provided by Nick Harrison.

A unique feature of the album is that it splits the heavy tracks from the lighter tracks: all the ballads are on side 1, while all the rockers are on side 2.

Track listing

Personnel
 Norman Barratt – guitar, vocals
 J.D. Hughes – keyboards, vocals, wind
 Lester Williams – bass, vocals
 Barry Davenport – drums

References

1971 albums
Vertigo Records albums
Gravy Train (band) albums
Repertoire Records albums